Richard Allott was an Anglican priest in Ireland during the late eighteenth and early nineteenth centuries.

Allott was educated at Trinity College, Dublin. He was Dean of Raphoe from 1795  until his death in 1832.

References

18th-century Irish Anglican priests
Bishops of Limerick, Ardfert and Aghadoe
1832 deaths
Alumni of Trinity College Dublin
Deans of Raphoe